Insult of officials, as well including the head of state or foreign heads of state, the state itself or its symbols, is a crime in some countries.

Law by jurisdiction

References

Crime